Curriella is a genus of trilobites in the order Phacopida, that existed during the lower Silurian in what is now Scotland. It was described by Lamont in 1978, and the type species is Curriella newlandensis; the species epithet was derived from the type location, the Newlands Formation. It also contains the species C. clancyi.

References

External links
 Curriella at the Paleobiology Database

Silurian trilobites of Europe
Fossil taxa described in 1978
Encrinuridae genera
Fossils of Great Britain
Paleozoic life of the Northwest Territories